Washago Aerodrome is located  west southwest of Washago, Ontario, Canada. It appears on Nav Canada navigation charts as an abandoned aerodrome, and is no longer listed in the Canada Flight Supplement. The former runway is still visible from the air.

References

Registered aerodromes in Ontario